Anima may refer to:

Animation 
 Ánima (company), a Mexican animation studio founded in 2002
 Córdoba International Animation Festival – ANIMA, in Argentina

Religion and philosophy
 Animism, the belief that objects, places, and creatures all possess a distinct spiritual essence
 Anima, the Latin term for the "animating principle" and the Latin translation of the Greek psyche
 On the Soul (De anima), Aristotle's treatise on the soul
 Soul, the incorporeal essence of a living being in many religious, philosophical, and mythological traditions
 Spirit (animating force), the vital principle or animating force within all living things
 Anima and animus, expressions of the unconscious or true inner self of an individual in Carl Jung's school of analytical psychology

People

Given name
 Anima Anandkumar, professor of computing
 Anima Choudhury (born 1953), singer from India
 Anima Patil-Sabale, Indian Software and Aerospace Engineer
 Anima Roy, Bangladeshi academic and Rabindra Sangeet singer
 Anima Wilson, Ghanaian politician

Surname
 William Bona Anima (died 1110), medieval archbishop of Rouen

Films 
 Anima – Symphonie phantastique, a 1981 Austrian experimental film based on Berlioz' symphony
 Anima (2003 film), a 2003 American short film
 Ánima, a 2018 Mexican film directed by Kuno Becker with Patricia Reyes Spíndola, Javier Díaz Dueñas
 Anima, a 1998 film with George Bartenieff
 Anima (2019 film), a short film directed by Paul Thomas Anderson

Games 
 Anima (Final Fantasy X), in the video games Final Fantasy X and Final Fantasy X-2
 Anima (Fire Emblem), in the Fire Emblem video game series
 Anima (role-playing game), a table-top role-playing game franchise

Manga/comics 
 Anima (webcomic), by Singapore writer Johnny Tay
 Anima (comics), a comic book published by DC Comics
 +Anima, a 2001 manga series by Natsumi Mukai
 Neon Genesis Evangelion: ANIMA, a novel

Music

Recordings
 Anima (Nightmare album)
 Ænima, a 1996 album by rock band Tool
 Anima (Vladislav Delay album), 2001
 Anima (Thom Yorke album), 2019
 Anima,, album by Riccardo Cocciante 1974
 "Anima", single by Romina Falconi
 Anima Animus, 1999 album by The Creatures
 "Anima", 2020 single by Reona
 "Anima", 2020 album by DAOKO

Performers
 Anima (chorus), a children's chorus based near Chicago, Illinois
 Anima (ensemble), a Brazilian chamber music ensemble
 Anima, 1970s German duo on Ohr
 Anima (band), an alternative rock band from Turkey
 Aenima (band), Portuguese band
 Anima Sound System, a Hungarian electronic band

Other uses 
 Anima, Togo, village in the Doufelgou Prefecture in the Kara Region
 Gum anima or gum animae, a kind of gum or resin
 Anima (novel), a 1972 novel by Marie Buchanan
 Anima (organization), Danish animal-rights organization
 Anima (play), an Italian play

See also 
 Anima Mundi (disambiguation)
 Animas (disambiguation)
 Anema (disambiguation)
 Anemia (disambiguation)
 Las Animas (disambiguation)
 Vitalism